Rumanová is a village and municipality in the Nitra District in western central Slovakia, in the Nitra Region.

History
In historical records  the village was first mentioned in 1156, but in that time as so-called "Tomanová".

Geography
The village lies at an altitude of 160 metres and covers an area of 11.656 km². It has a population of about 770 people.

Ethnicity
The population is about 98% Slovak.

References

External links
http://www.statistics.sk/mosmis/eng/run.html
http://www.rumanova.sk/

Villages and municipalities in Nitra District